In linear algebra and functional analysis, the partial trace is a generalization of the trace.  Whereas the trace is a scalar valued function on operators, the partial trace is an operator-valued function.  The partial trace has applications in quantum information and decoherence which is relevant for quantum measurement and thereby to the decoherent approaches to interpretations of quantum mechanics, including consistent histories and the relative state interpretation.

Details 

It is defined as follows: 
has a matrix representation

Now for indices k, i in the range 1, ..., m, consider the sum

This gives a matrix bk, i. The associated linear operator on V is independent of the choice of bases and is by definition the partial trace.

Among physicists, this is often called "tracing out" or "tracing over" W to leave only an operator on V in the context where W and V are Hilbert spaces associated with quantum systems (see below).

Invariant definition 
The partial trace operator can be defined invariantly (that is, without reference to a basis) as follows: it is the unique linear map 
 
such that

From this abstract definition, the following properties follow:

Category theoretic notion

It is the partial trace of linear transformations that is the subject of Joyal, Street, and Verity's notion of Traced monoidal category. A traced monoidal category is a monoidal category  together with, for objects X, Y, U in the category, a function of Hom-sets,

satisfying certain axioms.

Another case of this abstract notion of partial trace takes place in the category of finite sets and bijections between them, in which the monoidal product is disjoint union. One can show that for any finite sets, X,Y,U and bijection  there exists a corresponding "partially traced" bijection .

Partial trace for operators on Hilbert spaces 

The partial trace generalizes to operators on infinite dimensional Hilbert spaces. Suppose V, W are Hilbert spaces, and 
let

be an orthonormal basis for W.  Now there is an isometric isomorphism

Under this decomposition, any operator  can be regarded as an infinite matrix
of operators on V

where .

First suppose T is a non-negative operator. In this case, all the diagonal entries of the above matrix are non-negative operators on V.  If the sum

converges in the strong operator topology of L(V), it is independent of the chosen basis of W.  The partial trace TrW(T) is defined to be this operator.  The partial trace of a self-adjoint operator is defined if and only if the partial traces of the positive and negative parts are defined.

Computing the partial trace 

Then

The superscripts in parentheses do not represent matrix components, but instead label the matrix itself.

Partial trace and invariant integration 

In the case of finite dimensional Hilbert spaces, there is a useful way of looking at partial trace involving integration with respect to a suitably normalized Haar measure μ over the unitary group U(W) of W. Suitably normalized means that μ is taken to be a measure with total mass dim(W).

Theorem. Suppose V, W are finite dimensional Hilbert spaces.  Then

commutes with all operators of the form  and hence is uniquely of the form . The operator R is the partial trace of T.

Partial trace as a quantum operation 

The partial trace can be viewed as a quantum operation. Consider a quantum mechanical system whose state space is the tensor product  of Hilbert spaces. A mixed state is described by a density matrix ρ, that is 
a non-negative trace-class operator of trace 1 on the tensor product 

To show that this is indeed a sensible way to assign a state on the A subsystem to ρ, we offer the following justification. However one chooses to define a reduced state , there should be consistency of measurement statistics.

We see that this is satisfied if  is as defined above via the partial trace. Furthermore, such operation is unique.

Let T(H) be the Banach space of trace-class operators on the Hilbert space H. It can be easily checked that the partial trace, viewed as a map 

is completely positive and trace-preserving.

The density matrix ρ is Hermitian, positive semi-definite, and has a trace of 1. It has a spectral decomposition:

Its easy to see that the partial trace  also satisfies these conditions.

Note that the term  represents the probability of finding the state  when the composite system is in the state .

Comparison with classical case 

Suppose instead of quantum mechanical systems, the two systems A and B are classical. The space of observables for each system are then abelian C*-algebras.  These are of the form C(X) and C(Y) respectively for compact spaces X, Y. The state space of the composite system is simply

A state on the composite system is a positive element ρ of the dual of C(X × Y), which by the Riesz-Markov theorem corresponds to a regular Borel measure on X × Y. The corresponding reduced state is obtained by projecting the measure ρ to X. Thus the partial trace is the quantum mechanical equivalent of this operation.

Linear algebra
Functional analysis